The 1872 Rodney by-election was a by-election held on 16 March 1872 in the  electorate in the Auckland region of New Zealand during the 5th New Zealand Parliament.

The by-election was caused by the resignation of the incumbent MP Harry Farnall on 17 January 1872.

The by-election was won by John Sheehan. He was unopposed.

References

Rodney 1872
1872 elections in New Zealand
Politics of the Auckland Region
March 1872 events